This is a list of Polish rabbis, who either lived in Poland or were born there.

Hassidsm 

The rise of Hasidic Judaism within Poland's borders and beyond has had a great influence on the rise of neo Haredi Judaism all over the world, with a continuous influence that has been felt from the inception of the Hasidic movements and its dynasties by famous rebbes until the present time. The following are noteworthy:

 Aleksander Hasidism
 Belz Hasidism
 Bobov Hasidism
 Ger Hasidism
 Nadvorna Hasidism
 Sassov Hasidism

Polish Rabbis 

Some famous Polish and Polish-born rabbis include:

 Avraham Mordechai Alter, 4th Gerer Rebbe (the Imrei Emes)
 Pinchas Menachem Alter, 7th Gerer Rebbe (the Pnei Menachem)
 Simcha Bunim Alter, 6th Gerer Rebbe (the Lev Simchah)
 Yehudah Aryeh Leib Alter, 3rd Gerer Rebbe (the Sfas Emes)
 Yaakov Aryeh Alter, 8th (and current) Gerer Rebbe
 Yitzchak Meir Alter, 1st Gerer Rebbe (the Chidushei HaRim)
 Baruch Ashlag
 Yehuda Ashlag
 Zvi Hirsch Chajes
 Avraham Danzig
 Elimelech of Lizhensk
 Joshua Falk
 Yaakov Gesundheit
 Avraham Gombiner
 Kalonymus Haberkasten
 Yitzchok Hutner
 Pinchas Menachem Justman (the Sifsei Tzadik)
 Yisrael Meir Lau (later Chief Rabbi of Israel)
 Menachem Mendel of Kotzk
 Shlomo Hakohen Rabinowicz, first Radomsker Rebbe
 Shlomo Chanoch Hakohen Rabinowicz, fourth Radomsker Rebbe
 Shalom Rokeach of Belz
 Yaakov Yitzchak of Lublin

Rabbis philosophers born on Posen, West Prussia, etc 
 Ismar Elbogen
 Abraham Joshua Heschel
 Samuel Holdheim
 Kaufmann Kohler
 Moritz Lazarus
 Hermann Tietz (rabbi)
 Joseph Case

 See also List of German Jews;

Rabbis and philosophers born in Austrian Galicia 
 Rabbi Jacob Avigdor
 Rabbi Salo Wittmayer Baron
 Salomon Buber
 Zwi Perez Chajes
 Rebbe Aharon Rokeach of Belz
 Rebbe Shalom Rokeach of Belz
 Rebbe Yissachar Dov Rokeach of Belz
 Friedrich Weinreb

 See also List of Austrian Jews;

Rabbis philosophers born on Silesia, Brandenburg, Pomerania & Eastern Prussia 
 See List of German Jews;

See also 
 List of Polish Jews, List of North European Jews (Lithuania, etc), List of East European Jews (Southern Lithuania - Belarus), List of Ukrainian Jews (Ukraine - Galicia, Volhynia, et al.)
 List of Hasidic dynasties

 
Rabbis
Rabbis
Lists of rabbis